Leslie Herbert Irwin, CBE (1 May 1898 – 28 January 1985) was an Australian politician. Born in Newcastle, New South Wales, he was educated at state schools and underwent military service 1916–30. Upon the end of his service, he became a bank manager. In 1963, he was selected as the Liberal candidate for the seat of Mitchell in the Australian House of Representatives. He was the last person born in the nineteenth century, the last person born before Federation, and the last World War I veteran elected to the House. He held Mitchell until his defeat in 1972. Irwin died in 1985.

References

Liberal Party of Australia members of the Parliament of Australia
Members of the Australian House of Representatives for Mitchell
Members of the Australian House of Representatives
Australian military personnel of World War I
Australian Commanders of the Order of the British Empire
1898 births
1985 deaths
20th-century Australian politicians